The 1936 West Tennessee State Teachers football team was an American football team that represented the West Tennessee State Teachers College (now known as the University of Memphis) as a member of the Southern Intercollegiate Athletic Association during the 1936 college football season. In their thirteenth season under head coach Zach Curlin, West Tennessee State Teachers compiled an 0–9 record.

Schedule

References

West Tennessee State Teachers
Memphis Tigers football seasons
College football winless seasons
West Tennessee State Teachers football